Margarita Mercado Echegaray (Born December 7, 1980) is an attorney, the former Solicitor General of Puerto Rico, and the youngest to hold such post. Mercado has a bachelor's degree in political science and history of the Americas, and a juris doctor from the University of Puerto Rico School of Law. She also has a master of laws in constitutional law and civil rights from Columbia University. Before her appointment, Mercado served as a law clerk at the United States Court of Appeals for the First Circuit, and as a law clerk for Anabelle Rodríguez in the Supreme Court of Puerto Rico.

Mercado's most prominent cases includes the defense of the government of Puerto Rico against a lawsuit presented by the Puerto Rico Association of Members of the Judiciary. The Association claims that Act 162 of 2013 is unconstitutional and that it minimizes the principle of judicial independence.

Notes

References 

1980 births
Columbia Law School alumni
Living people
Puerto Rican lawyers
University of Puerto Rico alumni